Arthur Frommer (born July 17, 1929) is a travel writer. He founded the Frommer's brand of travel guides.

Frommer was born in Jefferson City, Missouri, and moved to Brooklyn, New York when he was 14. He graduated from New York University in 1950 with a political science degree, and graduated with honors from Yale Law School, where he was an editor of the Yale Law Journal, in 1953.

Frommer was drafted into the United States Army during the Korean War. Rather than being sent to Korea, he was sent to Europe because of his linguistic abilities. In 1955, while serving in Germany, Frommer wrote and self-published a guidebook called The GI's Guide to Traveling In Europe. It sold out its first print run.

In 1957, Frommer followed up with a civilian version called Europe on 5 Dollars a Day, which covered major European urban destinations. It also sold out its first run of 5,000 copies. In 1962, Frommer founded tour operator $5-a-Day Tours, Inc. He left the practice of law in 1962 to pursue his travel business, Arthur Frommer International, Inc., of which he was chairman and president until 1981.

Frommer's writing was not restricted to travel. His The Bible and the Public Schools (1963) was a defense of that year's Supreme Court decision banning compulsory Bible reading in public schools. His Goldwater From A to Z (1964) was an argument against the Republican presidential candidate Barry Goldwater in the 1964 United States presidential election.

In 1969, Frommer built a hotel in Amsterdam, now known as the Hotel Mercure Amsterdam Arthur Frommer, and part of the Accor group.

Frommer sold the travel guide book business to Simon & Schuster in 1977, it changed hands a few times, and Frommer eventually reacquired the rights.

In the 1980s, he published Frommer's New World of Travel, which advocated alternative vacation styles, and founded Budget Travel magazine, which he sold to Newsweek. He briefly ventured into general bargain shopping in 2005–2006 with the quarterly magazine Arthur Frommer's Smart Shopping. He writes a travel column syndicated through King Features Syndicate. He has a weekly syndicated radio show, The Travel Show with Arthur and Pauline Frommer, also hosted with his daughter Pauline (from his first marriage), co-president of Frommer Media LLC.

Notes

External links
 Frommer's travel advice web site
 Budget travel advice website
 The Frommer's Travel Show (podcast)

1929 births
Living people
People from Jefferson City, Missouri
American travel writers
American male non-fiction writers
Travel broadcasters
New York University alumni
Yale Law School alumni
American company founders
Jewish American military personnel
Paul, Weiss, Rifkind, Wharton & Garrison people
21st-century American Jews